The Mississippi Press Association is a trade association located in the capital city of Jackson, Mississippi, which represents newspapers from Mississippi that are published at least weekly and are for sale to a general readership.

Erle Johnston, the owner of The Scott County Times from 1942 to 1983 was in 1949 elected as the youngest president ever of the MPA. He went on to become the executive director of the Mississippi State Sovereignty Commission from 1963 to 1968 and the mayor of Forest from 1981 to 1985.

References

External links
Official web site
Mississippi Newspapers

Newspaper associations
Organizations with year of establishment missing